John Shaw (born 6 July 1968 in Scotland) is a Scottish former rugby union player and coach and now referee who played for Glasgow Warriors at the Flanker position.

Rugby Union career

Amateur career

Shaw played for West of Scotland

Shaw played for Currie RFC in 2001-2. and captained the side.

He played for East Kilbride RFC at Flanker. after his time at Currie.

In 2007 he was playing for a Scottish Classics XV side. Afterwards he felt unwell and a heart attack was diagnosed.

Professional career

As the Flanker named for Warriors first match as a professional team - against Newbridge in the European Challenge Cup - Shaw has the distinction of being given Glasgow Warrior No. 7 for the provincial side.

On moving to Currie, Shaw still played for Glasgow much to the dismay of Edinburgh Rugby who had prematurely included him in their squad to face Glasgow.

He played for Glasgow in their match against South Africa in 1998. he also played for the amateur Glasgow District against Scotland Under-21 in 2001.

International career

He was capped for Scotland A.

Coaching career

He became a player-coach for the East Kilbride side under Fraser Stott in 2003.

Shaw was to coach Waysiders Drumpellier from 2006 to 2010

Shaw was to coach Whitecraigs RFC from 2010

Refereeing career

He is now refereeing rugby matches.

Outside of rugby

Away from rugby, he is the managing director of Scaffolding Scotland.

Shaw was arrested and charged with assault and disorderly conduct in Scottsdale, AZ on 3 December 2016.

External links 
 EPCR Profile
 Linked In Profile
 Glasgow v Edinburgh 2001

References 

1968 births
Living people
Scottish rugby union coaches
Scottish rugby union players
Glasgow Warriors players
West of Scotland FC players
Currie RFC players
East Kilbride RFC players
Waysiders Drumpellier RFC players
Whitecraigs RFC players
Place of birth missing (living people)
Scotland 'A' international rugby union players
Rugby union flankers